Tenaru Falls is a waterfall in the rainforest of Guadalcanal, Solomon Islands. With a height of 63 meters and pouring into the Chea River, the falls are about two kilometers from a small village.

References

Landforms of the Solomon Islands
Waterfalls of the Solomon Islands
Guadalcanal